, contraction of , in a literal translation), is an epithet or title historically applied to popes, especially from the 6th to the 11th centuries, and was sometimes applied to other bishops also.

20th-century English translations of the phrase in the Litany of the Saints use the term "apostolic prelate". The sense-for-sense translation of the term "prelate" shifted in the same Litany of the Saints to "pope" since at least Pope John XXIII's 1959 encyclical Grata recordatio.

Domnus 

The word  is a shortened form of Latin  (lord). While the full form  is applied even to God and Jesus Christ, the shortened form is used only of human rulers, ecclesiastical or lay. For example, where, in the official English translation of the General Instruction of the Roman Missal (GIRM), 175, the deacon who is about to read the Gospel requests the presiding priest's blessing, saying in a low voice: "Your blessing, Father"; what he says in the Latin text of the General Instruction, 175 is: Iube, domne, benedicere (not domine).

A similar usage survives in the honorific Don, in Italian and Spanish, and Dom, in French and Portuguese.

Umberto Benigni wrote, in Catholic Encyclopedia, that "perhaps the only example" of the use of domnus apostolicus by Greek authors is the second letter from Theodore the Studite to Leo III, .

Apostolicus 

The pope is described by the nominalized adjective  (apostolic), because he occupies an apostolic see. Since the Holy See (or Roman See) is the apostolic see in Western Christianity,  meant simply the Roman See, and  the bishop of Rome. Claude of Turin "gives a curious explanation" as meaning , – a custodian of the apostle.

A list of popes compiled during the papacy of Pope Vigilius begins:  ("Here begin the names of the Apostolics").

There are also the expression  ("apostolicate" = pontificate) and the ablative absolute  ("during the apostolicate/pontificate of").

In Gaul the term  (apostolic see) was used, as early as the 5th century, to describe any episcopal see, even if not founded by an apostle. Benigni explains this usage is based on the bishops being successors of the apostles. And although, in the 9th century the title became reserved to popes even in the Frankish empire, there are traces of its former use even in the 11th century: the Council of Rheims (1049) excommunicated Cresconius, bishop of Iria Flavia,  (because he wrongly claimed the prestige of an apostolic name for himself), thinking of himself as the successor of Saint James the Greater, and the council declared  (that only the Roman pontiff was primate of the universal Church and apostolicus).

See also 

 Papal titles

Apostolic Prefect
Apostolic Vicar
Apostolic Exarch
Apostolic Administrator

Notes

References 

Catholic ecclesiastical titles
Papal titles